Do Waqt Ki Roti is a 1988 Indian Hindi-language film directed by Satpal and produced by M.P. Agrawal. It stars Feroz Khan, Sanjeev Kumar, Reena Roy, Sulakshana Pandit in pivotal roles. The music was composed by Laxmikant-Pyarelal.

Cast
 Feroz Khan as Shankar
 Sanjeev Kumar as Jailor Vijay Saxena
 Reena Roy as Shalini "Shalu"
 Sulakshana Pandit as Ganga
 Nirupa Roy as Kaushalya
 Amjad Khan as Tantia Bheel / Purshottam
 Shakti Kapoor as Thakur Shakti Singh
 Ranjeet as Jagga Singh
 Kamal Kapoor as Bhairav Singh
 Satyendra Kapoor as Dashrath
 Jagdeep as Baal Mukut Balwant Singh "Balam"

Soundtrack

References

External links

1980s Hindi-language films
1988 films
Films scored by Laxmikant–Pyarelal